Salix × rubra, the green-leaved willow or red osier, is a naturally occurring hybrid species of flowering plant in the family Salicaceae. It is the result of crosses between Salix purpurea (purple willow) and Salix viminalis (common osier). It is native to a large part of Europe, found where the parent species' ranges overlap. The straight, flexible stems are prized by basketmakers. There are a number of cultivars, with the fastigiate 'Eugenei' being the best known.

References

rubra
Plant nothospecies
Flora of Northern Europe
Flora of Central Europe
Flora of Southwestern Europe
Flora of Southeastern Europe
Flora of Eastern Europe
Plants described in 1762